Liberty Grove is an unincorporated community in Cecil County, Maryland, United States.

Notes

Unincorporated communities in Cecil County, Maryland
Unincorporated communities in Maryland